James Inglis (born 26 August 1986, Croydon, England) is a rugby union player for Harlequins in the Guinness Premiership. He is currently on loan to National League 1 team Esher. He plays as a second-row.

References

External links
Harlequins profile

1986 births
Living people
English rugby union players
Harlequin F.C. players
Rugby union players from Croydon